Pedro Alfredo Ortíz Angulo (born 19 February 1990) is an Ecuadorian footballer who plays as a goalkeeper for CS Emelec and the Ecuador national team.

Club career
Ortíz made his professional debut while playing for Deportivo Azogues in 2009.

International career
Ortíz made his senior debut for Ecuador on 5 September 2019 in a 1–0 friendly win over Peru.

References

1990 births
Living people
Sportspeople from Esmeraldas, Ecuador
Ecuadorian footballers
Association football goalkeepers
Deportivo Azogues footballers
Delfín S.C. footballers
C.S. Emelec footballers
Ecuadorian Serie B players
Ecuadorian Serie A players
Ecuador international footballers
2019 Copa América players
2021 Copa América players